In Chile, the National Prize for Literature (Premio Nacional de Literatura) was created by Law No. 7,368 during the presidency of Juan Antonio Ríos on 8 November 1942. It consists of a lump-sum monetary prize (16 million Chilean pesos, about US$30K) and a lifetime monthly stipend (20 UTM, about US$17K/year). It was originally awarded every year until the amendments introduced by Law No. 17,595 of 1972, when it became biennial. It's regarded as one of the National Prizes in their homeland. 

Winners are selected on the overall quality of their works, regardless of genre.

Winners of the National Prize for Literature 

 1942: Augusto d'Halmar
 1943: Joaquín Edwards Bello
 1944: Mariano Latorre
 1945: Pablo Neruda
 1946: Eduardo Barrios
 1947: Samuel Lillo
 1948: Angel Cruchaga
 1949: Pedro Prado
 1950: José Santos González Vera
 1951: Gabriela Mistral
 1952: Fernando Santiván
 1953: Daniel de la Vega
 1954: Víctor Domingo Silva
 1955: Francisco Antonio Encina
 1956: Max Jara
 1957: Manuel Rojas
 1958: Diego Dublé Urrutia
 1959: Hernán Díaz Arrieta
 1960: Julio Barrenechea
 1961: Marta Brunet
 1962: Juan Guzmán Cruchaga
 1963: Benjamín Subercaseaux
 1964: Francisco Coloane
 1965: Pablo de Rokha
 1966: Juvencio Valle
 1967: Salvador Reyes Figueroa
 1968: Hernán del Solar
 1969: Nicanor Parra
 1970: Carlos Droguett
 1971: Humberto Díaz Casanueva
 1972: Edgardo Garrido
 1974: Sady Zañartu
 1976: Arturo Aldunate Phillips
 1978: Rodolfo Oroz
 1980: Roque Esteban Scarpa
 1982: Marcela Paz
 1984: Braulio Arenas
 1986: Enrique Campos Menéndez
 1988: Eduardo Anguita
 1990: José Donoso
 1992: Gonzalo Rojas
 1994: Jorge Edwards
 1996: Miguel Arteche
 1998: Alfonso Calderón
 2000: Raúl Zurita
 2002: Volodia Teitelboim
 2004: Armando Uribe
 2006: José Miguel Varas
 2008: Efraín Barquero
 2010: Isabel Allende
 2012: Óscar Hahn
 2014: Antonio Skármeta
 2016: Manuel Silva Acevedo
 2018: Diamela Eltit
 2020: Elicura Chihuailaf
 2022: Hernán Rivera Letelier

External links 
Dirección de Bibliotecas, Archivos y Museos (DIBAM) - Premio Nacional de Literatura: Presentación
Dirección de Bibliotecas, Archivos y Museos (DIBAM) - Past Winners

Chilean literary awards
Awards established in 1942

Spanish-language literary awards
1942 establishments in Chile